Aakash is space or æther in traditional Indian cosmology.

Aakash may also refer to:
 Aakash (tablet series)
 Aakash (tablet)
 Aakash (film)

People with the given name
 Aakash Chopra
 Aakash Choudhary
 Aakash Dabhade
 Aakash Dahiya
 Aakash Gandhi
 Aakash Talwar

See also 
 Akash (disambiguation)
 Akasha (disambiguation)